The 2011 Women's Asian Individual Squash Championships is the women's edition of the 2011 Asian Individual Squash Championships, which serves as the individual Asian championship for squash players. The event took place in Penang in Malaysia from 26 to 30 April 2011. Nicol David won her eighth Asian Individual Championships title, defeating Annie Au in the final.

Seeds

Draw and results

See also
2011 Men's Asian Individual Squash Championships
Asian Individual Squash Championships

References

External links
Asian Individual Squash Championships 2011 SquashSite website

2011 in squash
Squash in Asia
Squash tournaments in Malaysia
2011 in Malaysian women's sport
2011 in women's squash
International sports competitions hosted by Malaysia